There are a number of places named Sierra Morena. These include:

 Sierra Morena, a mountain range in Spain; 
 Sierra Morena, Cuba, a barrio and a village in Cuba; 
 Sierra Morena, California, a summit in the Santa Cruz Mountains (Sierra Morena also refers to that portion of the Santa Cruz Mountains running from Half Moon Bay Road in the north to Lexington Reservoir in the south).